The Oiching Formation is a geologic formation in Austria. It preserves fossils dating back to the Paleogene period.

See also

 List of fossiliferous stratigraphic units in Austria

References
 

Paleogene Austria